The 1980 Skate Canada International was held in Calgary, Alberta on October 30 – November 2. Medals were awarded in the disciplines of men's singles, ladies' singles, and ice dancing.

Results

Men

Ladies

Ice dancing

References

Skate Canada International, 1980
Skate Canada International
1980 in Canadian sports 
1980 in Alberta